Jan Louwers (3 July 1930 – 1 November 2012) was a Dutch professional footballer and millionaire businessman.

Career
Louwers played football for FC Eindhoven, PSV and Roda JC. The Jan Louwers Stadion is named after him.

After retiring in 1967 he became a wholesaler; in 1988 his company had a turnover of €80 million.

References

1930 births
2012 deaths
Dutch footballers
FC Eindhoven players
PSV Eindhoven players
Roda JC Kerkrade players
Footballers from Eindhoven
Dutch businesspeople
Association football forwards